Sanofi Biogenius Canada (SBC), formerly known as the Sanofi BioGENEius Challenge Canada (SBCC), is a national, biotechnology-focused science competition for Canadian high school and CEGEP students.

SBC challenges students to initiate and undertake university-level research projects. Students submit a project proposal to a scientific evaluation committee that reviews their proposed research. For approved projects, the committee suggests mentors from the local biotechnology community.

Working in teams or as individuals, the students spend approximately four months conducting research and collaborating with their mentor. In April, students compile their results, prepare scientific posters and present their findings at their regional competitions to a panel of judges from the local scientific, education and biotechnology communities. The judges grade students on originality and scientific merit, project execution and communication of their work. Cash prizes are awarded to the top five student teams and their schools. As well, in several regional competitions, one project is awarded a commercialization prize.

The winner of each regional competition moves forward to the national competition that has historically taken place at the Ottawa headquarters of the National Research Council (NRC) of Canada. The top national winner goes on to participate in the International BioGENEius Challenge, which takes place each year in conjunction with the annual Biotechnology Industry Organization (BIO) International Convention.

History 
The SBC program began in the Toronto area in 1992 as the Connaught Student Biotechnology Exhibition (CSBE), the competition was established to raise biotechnology awareness among high school students, educators as well as the public and give hands-on exposure to its many applicants. 

In 1996-97, the program expanded to Montreal, Quebec and to London, Ontario. The Ottawa region became the newest site in the fall of 1997. The biotechnology associations in Nova Scotia, Newfoundland, British Columbia and Saskatchewan launched competitions in the fall of 1998. In 2000, new programs were set up in Edmonton, Alberta and Manitoba. New Brunswick and Calgary, Alberta became competition sites in 2002. The 2005 competition marked the addition of Prince Edward Island as a participating region in the program. In 2009, Northern Manitoba was added as the 14th SBC region, and in 2010, students from Quebec City competed in the Montreal competition. Following a consolidation of programs in 2011, today’s Sanofi Biogenius Canada has nine regional competitions: Atlantic region, Quebec, Eastern Ontario, Greater Toronto Area, Southwestern Ontario, Manitoba, Saskatchewan, Alberta, and British Columbia.

The first national competition was held in 2002 when the BIO convention returned to Toronto, and has continued at the NRC headquarters in Ottawa for the past 10 years.

More than 4,700 students have participated in the SBC program since its inception in 1992.

Founder and Partners 
Sanofi Biogenius Canada was founded in 1992 by Sanofi Pasteur to engage younger students in biotechnology education.

The program is managed by Partners in Research, on behalf of Sanofi Pasteur and Sanofi Canada, and in partnership with science outreach and biotechnology industry organizations across Canada.

The SBC national program is sponsored by Sanofi Pasteur, Sanofi Canada, the National Research Council Canada, Canadian Institutes for Health Research, and the Centre for Drug Research and Development.

Research 
The competition is intended to assist students in carrying out their biotechnology research ideas, with students often basing their projects on personal scientific knowledge and around individual concerns. Students receive mentorship from local scientists and researchers on how to design a research plan, carry out experimental work, collect data, and analyze their findings for presentation to the regional competition audience. Occasionally, students may gain the opportunity to publish their work, thus giving them a more complete scientific research experience.

Competitions

Regional Competitions 
In the spring of each year, students present their research findings and work to a panel of judges in regional competitions across the country. The judging panel is composed of scientists, managers, presidents of companies, government representatives, and education representatives. The panel represents people from all walks of life and students are challenged to explain their science to the general public, and to present their experimental work in a convincing manner.

National Competition 
The SBC national competition brings together each of the regional winners at a competition held each year at the National Research Council of Canada headquarters.

The first national competition took place in 2002 at the BIO conference in Toronto. The 2003 through 2007 competitions were held via video-conferencing, with competitors presenting to a panel of judges located at the NRC in Ottawa. In 2008, the national competition switched to a live event held at the NRC headquarters, and has continued as a face-to-face event in each of the subsequent years.

Students give a 10-minute presentation in front of a panel of Canadian scientists. The 2014 national judging panel included representatives from NRC and Genome Canada.

Students compete for cash awards and a spot at the International BioGENEius Competition held at the BIO conference.

The National First-Place Winners from each year are listed below:

International Competition 
Since 2002, winners from the Canadian national competition have been competing in the international challenge.  Each year the top  Canadian winner goes on to participate in the International BioGENEius Challenge.

In 2007, Ted Paranjothy from Winnipeg, Manitoba won the US$7,500 first prize at the sanofi-aventis International BioGENEius Challenge in Boston. Canadians have placed within the top five in other years as well, with Anila Madiraju taking 3rd prize in 2003, and Rui Song winning the 3rd place award in 2012. In 2015 the  International BioGENEius Challenge. invited the top two Canadian competitors and Austin Wang from New Westminster BC won the $7,500 prize for the Global Environmental Challenge. In 2017, Tasnia Nabil of Windsor, ON was named the runner up in the International BioGENEius Challenge.

References

External links 
 Sanofi Biogenius Canada

\

Educational organizations based in Canada
Sanofi
Science competitions
Youth science